Mouleydier is a commune in the Dordogne department in Nouvelle-Aquitaine in southwestern France.

Mouleydier is the site of a bridge over the river Dordogne.

History
On 21 June 1944 the SS pillaged and burned Mouleydier and shot to death 22 members of the Resistance.

Population

See also
Communes of the Dordogne department

References

Communes of Dordogne